Shahine El-Hamus (born 2000) is a Dutch actor and rapper. He won the Golden Calf for Best Actor award at the 2020 Netherlands Film Festival for his role in the 2019 film The Promise of Pisa directed by Norbert ter Hall.

Career 

He appears in a television series based on the book Bestseller Boy by Dutch novelist and columnist Mano Bouzamour.

He also appears in the 2022 film Met mes directed by Sam de Jong.

Personal life 

His brother Shady El-Hamus is a film director; he made his directorial debut with the 2019 film About That Life.

Awards 

 2020: Golden Calf for Best Actor, The Promise of Pisa

Filmography 

 The Promise of Pisa (2019)
 Met mes (2022)

References

External links 
 

Living people
2000 births
Place of birth missing (living people)
21st-century Dutch male actors
Dutch male film actors
Golden Calf winners
Dutch rappers